Gift from SG Wannabe is the sixth Korean studio album by SG Wannabe. The album has so far sold 100,500 copies .

Music videos
One music video was produced for "I Love You" and "Cry Baby".

Notable tracks

"I Love You"
"I Love You" was the title song for this album. Yurisangja's Park Seung-hwa participated in the chorus of "I Love You".

"Cry Baby"
"Cry Baby" was the follow-up song.

Track listing

References

External links
Album information on Melon Music 

SG Wannabe albums
Stone Music Entertainment albums
2008 albums